Bacula striolata is a species of sea snail, a marine gastropod mollusc in the family Eulimidae. The species is one of three known species within the genus Bacula, the other two being Bacula lamberti and Bacula morisyuichiroi.

References

 Souverbie, M., 1875. Descriptions d'espèces nouvelles de l'Archipel Calédonien. Journal de Conchyliologie 23: 282-297
 Souverbie, M., 1876. Description d'espèces nouvelles de l'Archipel Calédonien. Journal de Conchyliologie 24: 376-381

External links
 To World Register of Marine Species
 Adams, H. & Adams, A. (1863). Descriptions of five new genera of Mollusca. Annals and magazine of natural history; zoology, botany, and geology. Series 3. 11: 18-20

Eulimidae
Gastropods described in 1863